Oecoptychius is an extinct genus of fossil ammonite cephalopods. The species lived during the Middle Jurassic.

Taxonomic position
Oecophtychius was named by Neumayr in 1878.  It is placed into Oecoptychitidae, a family of dwarf ammonites established by Arkell, 1957, that is a part of the superfamily Stephanoceratoidea.

Diagnosis
Oecoptychius is an eccentrically coiled, dwarf ammonite. Inner whorls smooth, spheroidal; outer whorls with fine biplicate ribbing, ventral groove, and an acute elbow at half a whorl before the aperture; peristome contracted, with outwardly directed lappets.

Distribution
Fossils of the Oecophtychius species have been found in Jurassic sediments of France, Germany and Madagascar.

References

 W.J. Arkell, et al., 1957. Mesozoic Ammonoidea; Treatise on Invertebrate Paleontology, Part L, Ammonoidea. Geological Society of America and University of Kansas Press.

Ammonitida genera
Haploceratoidea
Jurassic ammonites
Prehistoric animals of Madagascar